Ed Fischer may refer to:

Edmond H. Fischer (1920–2021), American-Swiss biochemist
Edward F. Fischer, professor of anthropology at Vanderbilt University

See also
Eduard Fischer (disambiguation)
Ed Fisher (disambiguation)